The Cassius Clay vs. Alonzo Johnson ten-round boxing match between Cassius Clay and  Alonzo Johnson was held in Louisville, Kentucky on July 22, 1961. Cassius Clay won the bout on points with a unanimous decision.

References

Johnson
1961 in boxing
Sports competitions in Louisville, Kentucky
1961 in sports in Kentucky
July 1961 sports events in the United States